Mansheng Wang is a Chinese artist who moved to Dobbs Ferry in 1996. He is a calligrapher and painter. His influences include traditional literati art, Buddhist art, and the Hudson Valley, which he began painting after he relocated there and continued to create artwork depicting it for ten years. Wang's interest in art began when he was a child during the Chinese cultural revolution. He uses materials such as reeds from the Hudson river and homemade paint made from crushed walnuts and acrylic paint combined as well as cardboard to create his pieces. Mansheng Wang's work has been exhibited in China at the Beijing art museum as well as in America at the Brooklyn Museum, the Baltimore Museum of Art, the Huntington Art Museum and Connecticut college.

References

Living people
21st-century Chinese calligraphers
21st-century Chinese painters
Year of birth missing (living people)